During the 1996–97 English football season, West Bromwich Albion F.C. competed in the Football League First Division.

Season summary
In February 1997, Ray Harford was named as West Bromwich's new manager in place of Alan Buckley, who was sacked with the Baggies hovering just above the relegation zone in Division One (which had been a familiar pattern since their promotion in 1993) and Harford did much to keep the club clear of relegation.

Final league table

Results
West Bromwich Albion's score comes first

Legend

Football League First Division

FA Cup

League Cup

First-team squad
Squad at end of season

Reserve squad

Notes

References

West Bromwich Albion F.C. seasons
West Bromwich Albion